The Journal of the American College of Cardiology is a peer-reviewed medical journal covering all aspects of cardiovascular disease, including original clinical studies, translational investigations with clear clinical relevance, state-of-the-art papers, review articles, and editorials interpreting and commenting on the research presented, published by the American College of Cardiology.

Abstracting and indexing 
The journal is abstracted and indexed in Current Contents, EMBASE, MEDLINE, Science Citation Index, and Scopus. According to the Journal Citation Reports, the journal has a 2020 impact factor of 24.094, ranking it 4th out of 141 journals in the category "Cardiac & Cardiovascular Systems".

Associated journals
 JACC: Basic to Translational Science
 JACC: CardioOncology
 JACC: Cardiovascular Imaging
 JACC: Cardiovascular Interventions
 JACC: Case Reports
 JACC: Clinical Electrophysiology
 JACC: Heart Failure

See also
 American Journal of Cardiology

References

External links 
 

Cardiology journals
Elsevier academic journals
English-language journals
Weekly journals
Publications established in 1983
Academic journals associated with learned and professional societies of the United States